Belgium was represented by Claude Lombard, with the song "Quand tu reviendras", at the 1968 Eurovision Song Contest, which took place on 6 April in London. The song was chosen at the Belgian preselection, held on 13 February. Former Belgian representative Tonia (1966) and future participant Nicole Josy (1973, as one half of Nicole & Hugo) also took part.

Before Eurovision

La Sélection Belge pour le Concours Eurovision de la Chanson 1968
La Sélection Belge pour le Concours Eurovision de la Chanson 1968 was the national final format developed by RTB in order to select Belgium's entry for the Eurovision Song Contest 1968. The competition was held on 13 February 1968.

Competing entries
RTB, in collaboration with SABAM, selected 10 artists and songs to participate in the contest.

Final
The final was held on 13 February 1968 from 20:30 to 21:15 CET. The name of the host and venue is not known. Ten songs competed in the contest, with the winner being decided upon by regional public juries from 4 Walloon provinces.

At Eurovision 
On the night of the final Lombard performed 3rd in the running order, following the Netherlands and preceding Austria. At the close of the voting "Quand tu reviendras" had received 8 points (3 from Italy and 1 apiece from Finland, France, Luxembourg, Portugal and the United Kingdom), placing Belgium joint 7th (with Monaco and Yugoslavia) of the 17 participating countries. The Belgian jury awarded 6 of its 10 points to France.

Voting

References 

1968
Countries in the Eurovision Song Contest 1968
Eurovision